Persatuan Sepakbola Tuban, commonly known as Persatu Tuban, or Persatu, is an Indonesian football club based in Tuban, East Java. They play in the Liga 3. Their nickname is Laskar Ronggolawe.

History 
They became the first champion of the Liga Nusantara after beating Laga FC 2–1 in the final on December 14, 2014.

Honours 
 Liga Nusantara
 Champions: 2014

References

External links 
 

Football clubs in Indonesia
Association football clubs established in 1975
Football clubs in East Java
1975 establishments in Indonesia